Torlopov is a Russian masculine surname, its feminine counterpart is Torlopova. It may refer to
Dmitry Torlopov (born 1977), Kazakhstani sprint canoer 
Nadezhda Torlopova (born 1978), Russian boxer
Vladimir Torlopov (born 1949), Russian politician

Russian-language surnames